Wheare is a surname. Notable people with the surname include:

Degory Wheare (1573–1647), historian, the first Camden Professor of Ancient History in the University of Oxford
Kenneth Wheare CMG (1907–1979), Australian academic who spent most of his career at Oxford University in England
Tom Wheare FRSA (born 1944), English school teacher and headmaster
Henry Wheare (born 1952), Cambridge and GB cox, and Hong Kong Vice-President of the Asian Patent Attorneys Association